Republic of Macedonia, under the name of the Former Yugoslav Republic of Macedonia (now North Macedonia), competed at the 2016 Summer Olympics in Rio de Janeiro, Brazil, from 5 to 21 August 2016.

The Olympic Committee of the Former Yugoslav Republic of Macedonia selected a team of six athletes, two men and four women, to compete in four different sports at these Games. For the first time in Olympic history, Macedonia was represented by more women than men.

Five Macedonian athletes made their Olympic debut in Rio de Janeiro, with individual medley swimmer Marko Blaževski returning for his second appearance from London 2012. Joining him was freestyle swimmer Anastasia Bogdanovski, who set a historic milestone as Macedonia's first female flag bearer in the opening ceremony.

Macedonia, however, failed to earn a single Olympic medal for the fourth consecutive in a row.

Athletics

Macedonian athletes have so far achieved qualifying standards in the following athletics events (up to a maximum of 3 athletes in each event):

Track & road events

Judo
 
North Macedonia has received an invitation from the Tripartite Commission to send a judoka competing in the women's half-middleweight category (63 kg) to the Olympics, signifying the nation's Olympic debut in the sport.

Shooting
 
North Macedonia has received an invitation from the Tripartite Commission to send Nina Balaban in the women's air rifle to the Olympics, as long as the minimum qualifying score (MQS) was met by March 31, 2016. This also signified the nation's Olympic comeback to the sport after an eight-year hiatus.

Qualification Legend: Q = Qualify for the next round; q = Qualify for the bronze medal (shotgun)

Swimming

North Macedonia has received a Universality invitation from FINA to send two swimmers (one male and one female) to the Olympics.

References

External links 
 
 

Olympics
2016
Nations at the 2016 Summer Olympics